The Northwest African Tactical Air Force (NATAF) was a component of the Northwest African Air Forces which itself reported to the Mediterranean Air Command (MAC). These new Allied air force organizations were created at the Casablanca Conference in January 1943 to promote cooperation between the British Royal Air Force (RAF), the American United States Army Air Force (USAAF), and their respective ground and naval forces in the North African and Mediterranean Theater of Operations (MTO).  Effective February 18, 1943, the NATAF and other MAC commands existed until December 10, 1943, when MAC was disbanded and the Mediterranean Allied Air Forces (MAAF) were established.  Acting Air Marshal Sir Arthur Coningham was the commander of NATAF.

The components of NATAF at the time of the Allied invasion of Sicily (Operation Husky) on July 10, 1943, are illustrated below.

Northwest African Tactical Air Force
Air Marshal Sir Arthur Coningham

For Operation Husky, No. 242 Group, originally a component of NATAF in February 1943, was assigned to the Northwest African Coastal Air Force (NACAF).  At the same time, Air Headquarters, Western Desert became known as Desert Air Force.  All of the fighter units of Desert Air Force formed No. 211 (Offensive Fighter) Group commanded by Air Commodore Richard Atcherley on April 11, 1943, in Tripoli.  The 99th Fighter Squadron was assigned to the XII Air Support Command on May 28, 1943, and subsequently attached to the 33rd Fighter Group.  The actual squadron assignments and detachments varied throughout the war depending on the specific needs of the air force. The table above illustrates the squadron assignments and commanders for the important period of World War II when the Allies prepared to invade Italy (Operation Husky), having just won the war in North Africa (Tunisia Campaign).  In recognition of XII Air Support Command's operations in Sicily, Supreme Allied Commander General Dwight D. Eisenhower presented Major General Edwin House with the Legion of Merit and stated the following:

"...for the first time established the application of a tactical air force operating in support of an American Army."

See also

 List of Royal Air Force commands

References

Allied air commands of World War II
Military units and formations of the Royal Air Force in World War II
Tactical air forces
Military units and formations of the United States Army Air Forces